A talking dog is a kind of talking animal, alleged or fictional.

Talking Dog or The Talking Dog may also refer to:

Talking Dog, Polish artistic event
McDuff, the Talking Dog, an NBC Saturday morning live action television program